Endre Elekes (born November 2, 1968) is a Hungarian former Olympic wrestler. He was born in Sfântu Gheorghe, Covasna County, Romania. When he competed in the Olympics, he was 5-8.5 (174 cm), and weighed 154 lbs (70 kg).

Wrestling career
His sports club was Csepel SC, Budapest, Hungary.

He came in fifth at the 1991 World Wrestling Championship and sixth at the 1993 World Wrestling Championship in 68.0 kg. Freestyle. He competed for Hungary at the 1992 Summer Olympics in Barcelona at the age of 23 in Wrestling--Men's Lightweight (68 kg), Freestyle, and came in 10th.

References 

Living people
1968 births
Hungarian male sport wrestlers
Olympic wrestlers of Hungary
People from Sfântu Gheorghe
Wrestlers at the 1992 Summer Olympics